The Ministry of Public Health is the health ministry of the Democratic Republic of the Congo.

It has a public health system based loosely on the historical Belgian colonial public health system.  The ministry is largely a policy and oversight organization, with operational functions embodied within a number of subordinate ministry organizations, including the Institute of Tropical Medicine, Institute of Biomedical Research (Institut National de Recherché Biomédicale) and the Kinshasa School of Public Health.  The latter trains physicians in public health, staffs the public health infrastructure composed of Health Zones, including the Health Zone doctors who provide both public health services and partial staffing of district hospitals.

In November 2012, Dr. Félix Kabange Numbi was appointed Health Minister of the Democratic Republic of the Congo. As of 2018, the position is held by Oly Ilunga Kalenga.

See also
William Close

References

External links
  Official Website of the Health Ministry of the Democratic Republic of the Congo

Public Health
Medical and health organisations based in the Democratic Republic of the Congo
Democratic Republic of the Congo